Aslayevo (Ahılay) is a rural locality (a village) in Mindyaksky Selsoviet, Uchalinsky District, Bashkortostan, Russia. The population was 39 as of 2010. There is 1 street.

Geography 
Aslayevo is located 85 km southwest of Uchaly (the district's administrative centre) by road. Battalovo and Vyatsky are the nearest rural localities.

References 

Rural localities in Uchalinsky District